Minnesota State Highway 250 (MN 250) is a  highway in southeast Minnesota, which runs from its intersection with State Highway 16 in Lanesboro and continues north to its northern terminus at its intersection with State Highway 30 in Arendahl Township. MN 250 passes through Lanesboro, Holt Township, and Arendahl Township.

Route description
Highway 250 serves as a north–south route in southeast Minnesota between Lanesboro and State Highway 30.

Highway 250 crosses the Root River in Lanesboro.

Most of the route is located within the Richard J. Dorer State Forest.

Highway 250 follows Parkway Avenue and Ashburn Street in Lanesboro.

The route is legally defined as Route 250 in the Minnesota Statutes.

History
Highway 250 was authorized on July 1, 1949.

The route was paved in 1950.

Highway 250 and intersecting State Highway 30 in northeast Fillmore County were once part of the route of U.S. Highway 16 until 1929, when that highway was rerouted on a new alignment along the Root River between Lanesboro and Rushford.

Major intersections

References

External links

Highway 250 at the Unofficial Minnesota Highways Page

250
Transportation in Fillmore County, Minnesota